James Franco is an American actor, filmmaker, and college instructor. He began acting on television, guest-starring in Pacific Blue (1997). He landed his breakthrough role in the comedy-drama television series Freaks and Geeks (1999–2000). After his film debut in Never Been Kissed (1999), Franco won a Golden Globe Award for Best Actor – Miniseries or Television Film and was nominated for Screen Actors Guild Award and Primetime Emmy Award in the same categories for playing the eponymous actor in the 2001 television biopic James Dean. He went on to play Harry Osborn in the superhero film Spider-Man (2002), and reprised the role in its sequels Spider-Man 2 (2004) and Spider-Man 3 (2007). For the last of the three, he garnered a nomination for the Saturn Award for Best Supporting Actor. His only screen appearance of 2003 was in the ballet film The Company. Franco directed and starred in the comedy The Ape (2005).

After playing one of the titular roles in the romantic drama Tristan & Isolde (2006), Franco starred in the Tony Bill-directed war drama Flyboys (2006). Two years later, he played against type in the action-comedy film Pineapple Express, and earned critical acclaim for portraying Scott Smith in the biographical film Milk alongside Sean Penn. For the former, he was nominated for a Golden Globe Award for Best Actor – Comedy. Franco portrayed the trapped canyoneer Aron Ralston in 127 Hours (2010), a survival drama, which earned him nominations for an Academy Award, BAFTA Award, Screen Actors Guild Award and Golden Globe Award, all for Best Actor. Franco appeared in four films in 2011, including the poorly-received fantasy film Your Highness, and the science fiction film Rise of the Planet of the Apes (2011), a critical and commercial success.

Franco had six roles in 2012 none of which had much success except the crime-comedy film Spring Breakers, in which he played a gangster to highly positive reviews. The following year, Franco played the titular role in the fantasy film Oz the Great and Powerful, and the disaster film This Is the End saw him play a fictional version of himself. For the first one, he was nominated for the Teen Choice Award for Choice Movie Actor - Fantasy. Also in 2013, he directed and starred in the drama As I Lay Dying. He starred in the action thriller Good People (2014), an adaptation of Marcus Sakey's 2008 novel of the same name. In the 2014 controversial satirical comedy The Interview, he was seen as a journalist instructed to assassinate a North Korean leader. He had nine film releases in 2015, most of which failed financially except the animated film The Little Prince, a modest commercial success. In 2017, Franco directed and starred in The Disaster Artist as Tommy Wiseau, for which he won a Golden Globe Award for Best Actor – Motion Picture Musical or Comedy.

Film

As director

As producer

As actor

Television

Video games

Music videos

Web

References

Bibliography 
"Andrew's Diaries"

External links 
 

Male actor filmographies
Director filmographies
American filmographies